Blessed Beatrice of Nazareth or in Dutch Beatrijs van Nazareth (c. 1200 – 1268) was a Flemish Cistercian nun. She was the first prose writer using an early Dutch language, a mystic, and the author of the notable Dutch prose dissertation known as the Seven Ways of Holy Love. She was also the first prioress of the Abbey of Our Lady of Nazareth in Nazareth near Lier in Brabant.

Sources
Evidence for her life comes from both her biography, published in Crisóstomo Henríquez's Lilia Cistercii, the origins, lives and deeds of the holy virgins of Cîteaux, (Douai 1633), and from her own work The Seven Ways of Holy Love (Seven Manieren van Heilige Minnen). The latter is a work of early mystic literature that describes seven stages of love, as it is purified and transformed, before it can return to God. It has a simple and balanced prose style, and is associated with the emergence of the 'bridal mysticism' movement.

Life
Beatrice was born in Tienen, Belgium, of a wealthy family. At the age of seven, her mother died, and she was sent to live with the Béguines in nearby Zoutleeuw, where she attended the local school. A little over a year later, her father arranged for her to return home.

Wishing to join a monastery, her father took her to the Cistercian nuns at Bloemendaal/Florival, where at the age of ten, she became an oblate. She continued her education at the monastery in Florival. At the age of fifteen, Beatrice asked to be allowed to enter the novitiate, and was initially refused due to her young age and delicate health. However, the following year she was admitted as a novice.

Later, in 1236,  she was sent to commence the new foundation at Nazareth, a hamlet near Lier, Belgium. She practised very severe austerities, wearing a girdle of thorns and compressing her body with cords. In her visions, Jesus is said to have appeared to her and to have pierced her heart with a fiery dart.  Her devotion to the Eucharist resulted in bleeding and physical collapse.

She died in 1268 and was buried at the convent of Nazareth. Legend says that after Nazareth was abandoned during a time of disturbance, the body of Beatrice was translated by angels to the city of Lier.

Veneration
She is known as Blessed within the  Catholic church. Her feast day is 29 July.

References

Further reading
Modern editions
The Life of Beatrice of Nazareth, 1200-1268, trans Roger DeGanck, (Kalamazoo, MI: Cistercian Publications, 1991)
 Beatrice of Nazareth, Seven Ways of Holy Love, as translated by Wim van den Dungen, (1997, 1998, 2006)

Secondary sources
 
 
 
 Meijer, Reinder, Literature of the Low Countries: A Short History of Dutch Literature in the Netherlands and Belgium. (New York: Twayne Publishers, Inc., 1971), pp16–17

External links
Beatrice Belgian university web page of Beatrice's life
 Kennis en Minne-mystiek

1200 births
1268 deaths
13th-century venerated Christians
13th-century women writers
13th-century writers
Beguines and Beghards
Belgian beatified people
Cistercian nuns
Middle Dutch writers
Flemish Christian mystics
People from Tienen
Women mystics
People from the Duchy of Brabant
People from Nazareth, Belgium